PSR J1930–1852 is a binary pulsar system, composed of a pulsar and a neutron star and orbiting around their common center of mass.

See also 
 Hulse–Taylor binary, first pulsar in a binary system discovered
 PSR J0737−3039, first double pulsar binary system discovered
 PSR J1946+2052, double neutron star system with the shortest known orbital period

Notes

References 

Pulsars
Double neutron star systems
Sagittarius (constellation)
Astronomical objects discovered in 2015